Batang Pilipino (Filipino Youth) Basketball League is a national inter-city and inter-municipality grassroots basketball league established during the time of the COVID-19 pandemic.

Founded by Jun Ebdane and Commissioner Ron Camara, the league holds its inaugural National Finals from January 27–29, 2023 in San Juan City which was participated in by 14 teams in boys Under-18 and 11 teams in girls Under-18 division, which were qualified from the regional elimination phases late last 2022.

The league provides an equal and inclusive opportunity to showcase the Filipino young talents, specifically the underprivileged and out-of-school-youth in the field of basketball, to be discovered and scouted by different colleges and universities from the UAAP and NCAA and to help the local government units in their grassroots development in sports.

References

Basketball leagues in the Philippines
Sports leagues established in 2020
2020 establishments in the Philippines